Lay's WOW Chips were fat-free potato chips produced by Frito-Lay containing Olestra. They were first introduced in 1998, and were marketed using the Lay's, Ruffles, Doritos, and Tostitos brands.  Although initially popular, charting sales of $400,000,000 in their first year, they subsequently dropped to $200,000,000 by 2000, as Olestra caused "abdominal cramping, diarrhea, fecal incontinence ["anal leakage"], and other gastrointestinal symptoms" in some customers, warnings were required to be included on the packaging, with the WOW bag bearing a warning that read, "This Product Contains Olestra. Olestra may cause abdominal cramping and loose stools. Olestra inhibits the absorption of some vitamins and other nutrients. Vitamins A, D, E, and K have been added." 

Around the same time, the WOW brand was renamed to "Light." The product then continued under that brand name until they were discontinued in 2016.

References

Brand name snack foods
Frito-Lay brands
Discontinued products
Products introduced in 1998
Brand name potato chips and crisps